Javier Ambrois Campaña  (May 9, 1932 in Montevideo, Uruguay – June 25, 1975 in Montevideo, Uruguay) was a Uruguayan footballer who played for clubs of Uruguay, Argentina and Brazil and the Uruguay national football team in the FIFA World Cup Switzerland 1954.

He and Humberto Maschio (Argentina), were the all-time top scorers of the 1957 South American Championship, with 9 goals each.

Teams
 Nacional 1950-1954
 Fluminense 1955
 Nacional 1955-1957
 Boca Juniors 1958-1959
 Lanus 1960
 Defensor Sporting 1962-1963

Career statistics

International

Honours
  Nacional 1950, 1952, 1955 and 1956 (Uruguayan Championship)
 Uruguay 1956 (Copa América in Uruguay)

References

External links
+

1932 births
1975 deaths
Uruguayan footballers
Uruguayan expatriate footballers
Uruguay international footballers
Club Nacional de Football players
Defensor Sporting players
Boca Juniors footballers
Uruguayan Primera División players
Argentine Primera División players
1954 FIFA World Cup players
Expatriate footballers in Brazil
Expatriate footballers in Argentina
Copa América-winning players
Association football forwards
Club Atlético Lanús footballers
Fluminense FC players